Telenomus remus is a species in the Platygastridae family, native to Sarawak and New Guinea.

References

Platygastridae
Hymenoptera of North America
Insects described in 1937